is a former professor of computational chemistry, noted for his prediction of the C60 molecule in 1970.

Osawa received his Master's of Engineering in chemistry from Kyoto University's Department of Industrial Chemistry and then became an engineer at Teijin Co., Ltd. In 1964, he returned to Kyoto University and earned a Doctorate of Engineering in chemistry under Professor Yoshida. After three years of postdoctoral work at the University of Wisconsin, Princeton University, and the State University of New York at Stony Brook, in 1970 he became an assistant professor at Hokkaido University. In 1990, Osawa became a full professor at Toyahashi University of Technology, where he retired in 2001. Upon his retirement, assisted by Futaba, Co., Ltd., headquartered in Chiba, Osawa started the research and development company Nano-Carbon Research Institute, Ltd.

C60 molecule prediction

The icosahedral C60H60 cage was mentioned in 1965 as a possible topological structure. Eiji Osawa predicted the existence of C60 in 1970. He noticed that the structure of a corannulene molecule was a subset of a football shape, and he hypothesised that a full ball shape could also exist. Japanese scientific journals reported  his idea, but it did not reach Europe or the Americas.

In 1996, Harold Kroto, Robert Curl and Richard Smalley were awarded the 1996 Nobel Prize in Chemistry for their roles in the discovery of this class of molecules. C60 and other fullerenes were later noticed occurring outside the laboratory.

References

Japanese chemists
1935 births
People from Toyama Prefecture
Living people
Toyohashi University of Technology people
Computational chemists